Factitious disorder imposed on another (FDIA), also known as fabricated or induced illness by carers (FII), and first named as Munchausen syndrome by proxy (MSbP), is a condition in which a caregiver creates the appearance of health problems in another person, typically their child. This may include injuring the child or altering test samples. The caregiver then presents the person as being sick or injured. Permanent injury or death of the victim may occur as a result of the disorder. The behaviour occurs without a specific benefit to the caregiver.

The cause of FDIA is unknown. The primary motive may be to gain attention and manipulate physicians. Risk factors for FDIA include pregnancy related complications and a mother who was abused as a child or has factitious disorder imposed on self. Diagnosis is supported when removing the child from the caregiver results in improvement of symptoms or video surveillance without the knowledge of the caregiver finds concerns. Those affected by the disorder have been subjected to a form of physical abuse and medical neglect.

Management of FDIA may require putting the child in foster care. It is not known how effective therapy is for FDIA; it is assumed it may work for those who admit they have a problem. The prevalence of FDIA is unknown, but it appears to be relatively rare. More than 95% of cases involve a person's mother.

The prognosis for the caregiver is poor. However, there is a burgeoning literature on possible courses of therapy.

The condition was first named as "Munchausen syndrome by proxy" in 1977 by British pediatrician Roy Meadow. Some aspects of FDIA may represent criminal behavior.

Signs and symptoms
In factitious disorder imposed on another, a caregiver makes a dependent person appear mentally or physically ill in order to gain attention. To perpetuate the medical relationship, the caregiver systematically misrepresents symptoms, fabricates signs, manipulates laboratory tests, or even purposely harms the dependent (e.g. by poisoning, suffocation, infection, physical injury). It is important to note the caregiver is not performing this behavior for obvious external reward, such as money. Studies have shown a mortality rate of between six and ten percent, making it perhaps the most lethal form of abuse.

In one study, the average age of the affected individual at the time of diagnosis was four years old. Slightly over 50% were aged 24 months or younger, and 75% were under six years old. The average duration from onset of symptoms to diagnosis was 22 months. By the time of diagnosis, six percent of the affected persons were dead, mostly from apnea (a common result of smothering) or starvation, and seven percent had long-term or permanent injury. About half of the affected had siblings; 25% of the known siblings were dead, and 61% of siblings had symptoms similar to the affected or that were otherwise suspicious. The mother was the perpetrator in 76.5% of the cases, the father in 6.7%.

Most present about three medical problems in some combination of the 103 different reported symptoms. The most-frequently reported problems are apnea (26.8% of cases), anorexia or feeding problems (24.6% of cases), diarrhea (20%), seizures (17.5%), cyanosis (blue skin) (11.7%), behavior (10.4%), asthma (9.5%), allergy (9.3%), and fevers (8.6%). Other symptoms include failure to thrive, vomiting, bleeding, rash, and infections. Many of these symptoms are easy to fake because they are subjective. A parent reporting that their child had a fever in the past 24 hours is making a claim that is impossible to prove or disprove. The number and variety of presented symptoms contribute to the difficulty in reaching a proper diagnosis.

Aside from the motive (most commonly attributed to be a gain in attention or sympathy), another feature that differentiates FDIA from "typical" physical child abuse is the degree of premeditation involved. Whereas most physical abuse entails lashing out at a child in response to some behavior (e.g., crying, bedwetting, spilling food), assaults on the FDIA victim tend to be unprovoked and planned.

Also unique to this form of abuse is the role that health care providers play by actively, albeit unintentionally, enabling the abuse. By reacting to the concerns and demands of perpetrators, medical professionals are manipulated into a partnership of child maltreatment. Challenging cases that defy simple medical explanations may prompt health care providers to pursue unusual or rare diagnoses, thus allocating even more time to the child and the abuser. Even without prompting, medical professionals may be easily seduced into prescribing diagnostic tests and therapies that may be painful, costly, or potentially injurious to the child. If the health practitioner resists ordering further tests, drugs, procedures, surgeries, or specialists, the FDIA abuser makes the medical system appear negligent for refusing to help a sick child and their selfless parent. Like those with Munchausen syndrome, FDIA perpetrators are known to switch medical providers frequently until they find one that is willing to meet their level of need; this practice is known as "doctor shopping" or "hospital hopping".

The perpetrator continues the abuse because maintaining the child in the role of patient satisfies the abuser's needs. The cure for the victim is to separate the child completely from the abuser. When parental visits are allowed, sometimes there is a disastrous outcome for the child. Even when the child is removed, the perpetrator may then abuse another child: a sibling or other child in the family.

Factitious disorder imposed on another can have many long-term emotional effects on a child. Depending on their experience of medical interventions, a percentage of children may learn that they are most likely to receive the positive parental attention they crave when they are playing the sick role in front of health care providers. Several case reports describe Munchausen syndrome patients suspected of themselves having been FDIA victims. Seeking personal gratification through illness can thus become a lifelong and multi-generational disorder in some cases.  In stark contrast, other reports suggest survivors of FDIA develop an avoidance of medical treatment with post-traumatic responses to it.

The adult caregiver who has abused the child often seems comfortable and not upset over the child's hospitalization. While the child is hospitalized, medical professionals must monitor the caregiver's visits to prevent an attempt to worsen the child's condition. In addition, in many jurisdictions, medical professionals have a duty to report such abuse to legal authorities.

Diagnosis
Use of the term "Munchausen syndrome by proxy" is controversial.  In the World Health Organization's International Statistical Classification of Diseases, 10th Revision (ICD-10), the official diagnosis is factitious disorder (301.51 in ICD-9, F68.12 in ICD-10).  Within the United States, factitious disorder imposed on another (FDIA or FDIoA) was officially recognized as a disorder in 2013, while in the United Kingdom, it is known as fabricated or induced illness by carers (FII).

In DSM-5, the diagnostic manual published by the American Psychiatric Association in 2013, this disorder is listed under 300.19 Factitious disorder. This, in turn, encompasses two types:

 Factitious Disorder Imposed on Self
 Factitious Disorder Imposed on Another (Previously Factitious Disorder by Proxy); the diagnosis is assigned to the perpetrator; the person affected may be assigned an abuse diagnosis (e.g. child abuse).

Both types include an optional specifier to identify if the observed behavior was a single episode or part of recurrent episodes.

Warning signs 
Warning signs of the disorder include:

 A child who has one or more medical problems that do not respond to treatment or that follow an unusual course that is persistent, puzzling, and unexplained. 
 Physical or laboratory findings that are highly unusual, discrepant with patient's presentation or history, or physically or clinically impossible.
 A parent who appears medically knowledgeable, fascinated with medical details and hospital gossip, appears to enjoy the hospital environment, and expresses interest in the details of other patients' problems.
 A highly attentive parent who is reluctant to leave their child's side and who themselves seem to require constant attention.
 A parent who appears unusually calm in the face of serious difficulties in their child's medical course while being highly supportive and encouraging of the physician, or one who is angry, devalues staff, and demands further intervention, more procedures, second opinions, and transfers to more sophisticated facilities.
 The suspected parent may work in the health-care field themselves or profess an interest in a health-related job.
 The signs and symptoms of a child's illness may lessen or simply vanish in the parent's absence (hospitalization and careful monitoring may be necessary to establish this causal relationship).
 A family history of similar or unexplained illness or death in a sibling.
 A parent with symptoms similar to their child's own medical problems or an illness history that itself is puzzling and unusual.
 A suspected emotionally distant relationship between parents; the spouse often fails to visit the patient and has little contact with physicians even when the child is hospitalized with a serious illness.
 A parent who reports dramatic, negative events, such as house fires, burglaries, or car accidents, that affect them and their family while their child is undergoing treatment.
 A parent who seems to have an insatiable need for adulation or who makes self-serving efforts for public acknowledgment of their abilities.
 A child who inexplicably deteriorates whenever discharge is planned.
 A child that looks for cueing from a parent in order to feign illness when medical personnel are present.
 A child that is overly articulate regarding medical terminology and their own disease process for their age.
 A child that presents to the Emergency Department with a history of repeat illness, injury, or hospitalization.

Epidemiology
FDIA is rare. Incidence rate estimates range from 1 to 28 per million children, although some assume that it may be much more common.

Studies have showed that over 90 percent of FDIA cases, the abuser is the mother or another female guardian or caregiver.  A psychodynamic model of this kind of maternal abuse exists.

Fathers and other male caregivers have been the perpetrators in only seven percent of the cases studied.  When they are not actively involved in the abuse, the fathers or male guardians of FDIA victims are often described as being distant, emotionally disengaged, and powerless. These men play a passive role in FDIA by being frequently absent from the home and rarely visiting the hospitalized child. Usually, they vehemently deny the possibility of abuse, even in the face of overwhelming evidence or their child's pleas for help.

Overall, male and female children are equally likely to be the victim of FDIA. In the few cases where the father is the perpetrator, however, the victim is three times more likely to be male.

One study in Italy found that 4 out of more than 700 children admitted to the hospital met the criteria (0.53%). In this study, stringent diagnostic criteria were used, which required at least one test outcome or event that could not possibly have occurred without deliberate intervention by the FDIA person.

Society and culture

Terminology
The term "Munchausen syndrome by proxy", in the United States, has never officially been included as a discrete mental disorder by the American Psychiatric Association, which publishes the Diagnostic and Statistical Manual of Mental Disorders (DSM), now in its fifth edition. Although the DSM-III (1980) and DSM-III-R (1987) included Munchausen syndrome, they did not include MSbP.  DSM-IV (1994) and DSM-IV-TR (2000) added MSbP as a proposal only, and although it was finally recognized as a disorder in DSM-5 (2013), each of the last three editions of the DSM designated the disorder by a different name.

FDIA has been given different names in different places and at different times. What follows is a partial list of alternative names that have been either used or proposed (with approximate dates):
  Factitious Disorder Imposed on Another (current) (U.S., 2013)  American Psychiatric Association, DSM-5
  Factitious Disorder by Proxy (FDP, FDbP) (proposed) (U.S., 2000)  American Psychiatric Association, DSM-IV-TR
  Fictitious Disorder by Proxy (FDP, FDbP) (proposed) (U.S., 1994)  American Psychiatric Association, DSM-IV
  Fabricated or Induced Illness by Carers (FII) (U.K., 2002)  The Royal College of Pediatrics and Child Health
  Factitious Illness by Proxy (1996)  World Health Organization
  Pediatric Condition Falsification (PCF) (proposed) (U.S., 2002)  American Professional Society on the Abuse of Children proposed this term to diagnose the victim (child); the perpetrator (caregiver) would be diagnosed "factitious disorder by proxy"; MSbP would be retained as the name applied to the 'disorder' that contains these two elements, a diagnosis in the child and a diagnosis in the caretaker.
  Induced Illness (Munchausen Syndrome by Proxy) (Ireland, 1999–2002)  Department of Health and Children
  Munchausen Syndrome by Proxy (2002) Professor Roy Meadow.
  Meadow's Syndrome (1984–1987) named after Roy Meadow.  This label, however, had already been in use since 1957 to describe a completely unrelated and rare form of cardiomyopathy.
  Polle Syndrome (1977–1984)  coined by Burman and Stevens, from the then-common belief that Baron Münchhausen's second wife gave birth to a daughter named Polle during their marriage. The baron declared that the baby was not his, and the child died from "seizures" at the age of 10 months. The name fell out of favor after 1984, when it was discovered that Polle was not the baby's name, but rather was the name of her mother's hometown.

While it initially included only the infliction of harmful medical care, the term has subsequently been extended to include cases in which the only harm arose from medical neglect, noncompliance, or even educational interference. The term is derived from Munchausen syndrome, a psychiatric factitious disorder wherein those affected feign disease, illness, or psychological trauma to draw attention, sympathy, or reassurance to themselves. Munchausen syndrome by proxy perpetrators, by contrast, are willing to fulfill their need for positive attention by hurting their own child, thereby assuming the sick role onto their child, by proxy. These proxies then gain personal attention and support by taking on this fictitious "hero role" and receive positive attention from others, by appearing to care for and save their so-called sick child. They are named after Baron Munchausen, a literary character based on Hieronymus Karl Friedrich, Freiherr von Münchhausen (1720–1797), a German nobleman and well-known storyteller. In 1785, writer and con artist Rudolf Erich Raspe anonymously published a book in which a fictional version of "Baron Munchausen" tells fantastic and impossible stories about himself, establishing a popular literary archetype of a bombastic exaggerator.

Initial description
"Munchausen syndrome" was first described by R. Asher in 1951 as when someone invents or exaggerates medical symptoms, sometimes engaging in self-harm, to gain attention or sympathy.

The term "Munchausen syndrome by proxy" was first coined by John Money and June Faith Werlwas in a 1976 paper titled " in the parents of psychosocial dwarfs: Two cases" to describe the abuse-induced and neglect-induced symptoms of the syndrome of abuse dwarfism. That same year, Sneed and Bell wrote an article titled "The Dauphin of Munchausen: factitious passage of renal stones in a child".

According to other sources, the term was created by the British pediatrician Roy Meadow in 1977.  In 1977, Meadow – then professor of pediatrics at the University of Leeds, England – described the extraordinary behavior of two mothers. According to Meadow, one had poisoned her toddler with excessive quantities of salt. The other had introduced her own blood into her baby's urine sample. This second case occurred during a series of Outpatient visits to the Paediatric Clinic of Dr. Bill Arrowsmith at Doncaster Royal Infirmary. He referred to this behavior as Munchausen syndrome by proxy (MSbP).

The medical community was initially skeptical of FDIA's existence, but it gradually gained acceptance as a recognized condition.

Controversy

During the 1990s and early 2000s, Roy Meadow was an expert witness in several murder cases involving MSbP/FII. Meadow was knighted for his work for child protection, though later, his reputation, and consequently the credibility of MSbP, became damaged when several convictions of child killing, in which he acted as an expert witness, were overturned. The mothers in those cases were wrongly convicted of murdering two or more of their children, and had already been imprisoned for up to six years.

One case was that of Sally Clark. Clark was a lawyer wrongly convicted in 1999 of the murder of her two baby sons, largely on the basis of Meadow's evidence. As an expert witness for the prosecution, Meadow asserted that the odds of there being two unexplained infant deaths in one family were one in 73 million. That figure was crucial in sending Clark to jail but was hotly disputed by the Royal Statistical Society, who wrote to the Lord Chancellor to complain.  It was subsequently shown that the true odds were much greater once other factors (e.g. genetic or environmental) were taken into consideration, meaning that there was a significantly higher likelihood of two deaths happening as a chance occurrence than Meadow had claimed during the trial. Those odds in fact range from a low of 1:8500 to as high as 1:200.  It emerged later that there was clear evidence of a Staphylococcus aureus infection that had spread as far as the child's cerebrospinal fluid.  Clark was released in January 2003 after three judges quashed her convictions in the Court of Appeal in London, but suffering from catastrophic trauma of the experience, she later died from alcohol poisoning.  Meadow was involved as a prosecution witness in three other high-profile cases resulting in mothers being imprisoned and subsequently cleared of wrongdoing: Trupti Patel, Angela Cannings and Donna Anthony.

In 2003, Lord Howe, the Opposition spokesman on health, accused Meadow of inventing a "theory without science" and refusing to produce any real evidence to prove that Munchausen syndrome by proxy actually exists. It is important to distinguish between the act of harming a child, which can be easily verified, and motive, which is much harder to verify and which FDIA tries to explain. For example, a caregiver may wish to harm a child out of malice and then attempt to conceal it as illness to avoid detection of abuse, rather than to draw attention and sympathy.

The distinction is often crucial in criminal proceedings, in which the prosecutor must prove both the act and the mental element constituting a crime to establish guilt. In most legal jurisdictions, a doctor can give expert witness testimony as to whether a child was being harmed but cannot speculate regarding the motive of the caregiver. FII merely refers to the fact that illness is induced or fabricated and does not specifically limit the motives of such acts to a caregiver's need for attention and/or sympathy.

In all, around 250 cases resulting in conviction in which Meadow was an expert witness were reviewed, with few changes, but all where the only evidence was Meadow's expert testimony were overturned. Meadow was investigated by the British General Medical Council (GMC) over evidence he gave in the Sally Clark trial. In July 2005, the GMC declared Meadow guilty of "serious professional misconduct", and he was struck off the medical register for giving "erroneous" and "misleading" evidence.
At appeal, High Court judge Mr. Justice Collins said that the severity of his punishment "approaches the irrational" and set it aside.

Collins's judgment raises important points concerning the liability of expert witnesses – his view is that referral to the GMC by the losing side is an unacceptable threat and that only the Court should decide whether its witnesses are seriously deficient and refer them to their professional bodies.

In addition to the controversy surrounding expert witnesses, an article appeared in the forensic literature that detailed legal cases involving controversy surrounding the murder suspect. The article provides a brief review of the research and criminal cases involving Munchausen syndrome by proxy in which psychopathic mothers and caregivers were the murderers. It also briefly describes the importance of gathering behavioral data, including observations of the parents who commit the criminal acts. The article references the 1997 work of Southall, Plunkett, Banks, Falkov, and Samuels, in which covert video recorders were used to monitor the hospital rooms of suspected FDIA victims. In 30 out of 39 cases, a parent was observed intentionally suffocating their child; in two they were seen attempting to poison a child; in another, the mother deliberately broke her three-month-old daughter's arm. Upon further investigation, those 39 patients, ages 1 month to 3 years old, had 41 siblings; 12 of those had died suddenly and unexpectedly.  The use of covert video, while apparently extremely effective, raises controversy in some jurisdictions over privacy rights.

Legal status
In most legal jurisdictions, doctors are allowed to give evidence only in regard to whether the child is being harmed. They are not allowed to give evidence in regard to the motive. Australia and the UK have established the legal precedent that FDIA does not exist as a medico-legal entity.

In a June 2004 appeal hearing, the Supreme Court of Queensland, Australia, stated:

The Queensland Supreme Court further ruled that the determination of whether or not a defendant had caused intentional harm to a child was a matter for the jury to decide and not for the determination by expert witnesses:

Principles of law and implications for legal processes that may be deduced from these findings are that:
Any matters brought before a Court of Law should be determined by the facts, not by suppositions attached to a label describing a behavior, i.e., MSBP/FII/FDBP;
MSBP/FII/FDBP is not a mental disorder (i.e., not defined as such in DSM IV), and the evidence of a psychiatrist should not therefore be admissible;
MSBP/FII/FDBP has been stated to be a behavior describing a form of child abuse and not a medical diagnosis of either a parent or a child. A medical practitioner cannot therefore state that a person "suffers" from MSBP/FII/FDBP, and such evidence should also therefore be inadmissible. The evidence of a medical practitioner should be confined to what they observed and heard and what forensic information was found by recognized medical investigative procedures;
A label used to describe a behavior is not helpful in determining guilt and is prejudicial. By applying an ambiguous label of MSBP/FII to a woman is implying guilt without factual supportive and corroborative evidence;
The assertion that other people may behave in this way, i.e., fabricate and/or induce illness in children to gain attention for themselves (FII/MSBP/FDBY), contained within the label is not factual evidence that this individual has behaved in this way. Again therefore, the application of the label is prejudicial to fairness and a finding based on fact.

The Queensland Judgment was adopted into English law in the High Court of Justice by Mr. Justice Ryder. In his final conclusions regarding Factitious Disorder, Ryder states that:

In his book Playing Sick (2004), Marc Feldman notes that such findings have been in the minority among U.S. and even Australian courts. Pediatricians and other physicians have banded together to oppose limitations on child-abuse professionals whose work includes FII detection. The April 2007 issue of the journal Pediatrics specifically mentions Meadow as an individual who has been inappropriately maligned.

In the context of child protection (a child being removed from the custody of a parent), the Australian state of New South Wales uses a "on the balance of probabilities" test, rather than a "beyond reasonable doubt" test. Therefore, in the case "The Secretary, Department of Family and Community Services and the Harper Children [2016] NSWChC 3", the expert testimony of Professor David Isaacs that a certain blood test result was "highly unlikely" to occur naturally or accidentally (without any speculation about motive), was sufficient to refuse the return of the affected child and his younger siblings to the mother. The children had initially been removed from the mother's custody after the blood test results became known. The fact that the affected child quickly improved both medically and behaviourly after being removed was also a factor.

Notable cases
Beverley Allitt, a British nurse who murdered four children and injured a further nine in 1991 at Grantham and Kesteven Hospital, Lincolnshire, was diagnosed with Munchausen syndrome by proxy.

Wendi Michelle Scott is a Frederick, Maryland, mother who was charged with sickening her four-year-old daughter.

The book Sickened, by Julie Gregory, details her life growing up with a mother who had Munchausen by proxy, who took her to various doctors, coached her to act sicker than she was and to exaggerate her symptoms, and who demanded increasingly invasive procedures to diagnose Gregory's enforced imaginary illnesses.

Lisa Hayden-Johnson of Devon was jailed for three years and three months after subjecting her son to a total of 325 medical actions – including being forced to use a wheelchair and being fed through a tube in his stomach. She claimed her son had a long list of illnesses including diabetes, food allergies, cerebral palsy, and cystic fibrosis, describing him as "the most ill child in Britain" and receiving numerous cash donations and charity gifts, including two cruises.

In the mid-1990s, Kathy Bush gained public sympathy for the plight of her daughter, Jennifer, who by the age of 8 had undergone 40 surgeries and spent over 640 days in hospitals for gastrointestinal disorders. The acclaim led to a visit with first lady Hillary Clinton, who championed the Bushs' plight as evidence of need for medical reform. However, in 1996, Kathy Bush was arrested and charged with child abuse and Medicaid fraud, accused of sabotaging Jennifer's medical equipment and drugs to agitate and prolong her illness. Jennifer was moved to foster care where she quickly regained her health. The prosecutors claimed Kathy was driven by Munchausen Syndrome by Proxy, and she was convicted to a five-year sentence in 1999. Kathy was released after serving three years in 2005, always maintaining her innocence, and having gotten back in contact with Jennifer via correspondence.

In 2014, 26-year-old Lacey Spears was charged in Westchester County, New York, with second-degree depraved murder and first-degree manslaughter.  She fed her son dangerous amounts of salt after she conducted research on the Internet about its effects. Her actions were allegedly motivated by the social media attention she gained on Facebook, Twitter, and blogs. She was convicted of second-degree murder on March 2, 2015, and sentenced to 20 years to life in prison.

Dee Dee Blanchard was a Missouri mother who was murdered by her daughter and a boyfriend in 2015 after having claimed for years that her daughter, Gypsy Rose, was sick and disabled; to the point of shaving her head, making her use a wheelchair in public, and subjecting her to unnecessary medication and surgery. Gypsy possessed no outstanding illnesses. Feldman said it is the first case he is aware of in a quarter-century of research where the victim killed the abuser. Their story was shown on HBO's documentary film Mommy Dead and Dearest and is featured in the Hulu limited series The Act. Gypsy Rose pleaded guilty to second-degree murder and is serving a ten-year sentence, her boyfriend was convicted of first-degree murder and is sentenced to life in prison without parole.

Rapper Eminem has spoken about how his mother would frequently take him to hospitals to receive treatment for illnesses that he did not have. His song "Cleanin' Out My Closet" includes a lyric regarding the illness, "...going through public housing systems victim of Münchausen syndrome. My whole life I was made to believe I was sick, when I wasn't 'til I grew up and blew up..." His mother's illness resulted in Eminem receiving custody of his younger brother, Nathan.

In 2013, when Justina Pelletier was 14, her parents took her to the emergency room at Boston Children's Hospital where doctors diagnosed her problems as psychiatric, but when her parents rejected the diagnosis and attempted to have her released, the hospital filed a report with Massachusetts Department of Children and Families alleging medical child abuse. This resulted in her being housed for 18 months in the psychiatric hospital, with her parents having limited access, until a judge ordered her returned to her parents. In 2016 her parents sued Boston Children's for medical malpractice, alleging that their civil rights were violated. At the trial, Pelletier's treating neurologist stated that several of her doctors suspected factitious disorder by proxy, and wanted her parents to stop encouraging her to be sick. Her parents lost the lawsuit, with one juror stating that Pelletier's parents thought of psychiatry as "psychological baloney".

Directed towards animals
Medical literature describes a subset of FDIA caregivers, where the proxy is a pet rather than another person. These cases are labeled Munchausen syndrome by proxy: pet (MSbP:P). In these cases, pet owners correspond to caregivers in traditional FDIA presentations involving human proxies.  No extensive survey has yet been made of the extant literature, and there has been no speculation as to how closely FDIA:P tracks with human FDIA.

See also
 List of Munchausen by proxy cases
 Folie à deux
 Hypochondria
 Munchausen by Internet
 Psychosomatic illness
 Run (2020 American film)
 Everything, Everything (novel)

References

Child abuse
Factitious disorders
Syndromes
Wikipedia medicine articles ready to translate